USS F-1 (SS-20) was an F-class submarine. She was named Carp when her keel was laid down by Union Iron Works of San Francisco, California, making her the first ship of the United States Navy named for the carp. She was launched on 6 September 1911 sponsored by Ms. J. Tynan, renamed F-1 on 17 November 1911, and commissioned on 19 June 1912.

Service history
Assigned to the First Submarine Group, Pacific Torpedo Flotilla, F-1 operated in the San Francisco, California area on trials and tests through 11 January 1913, when she joined the flotilla for training at sea between San Diego, California and San Pedro Submarine Base, San Pedro, California, then in San Diego Harbor. 

In late 1912, the boat — which then held the world's deep diving record, descending to  — slipped her mooring at Port Watsonville in Monterey Bay, California, and grounded on a nearby beach. While most of the crew of 17 safely evacuated, two men died in the incident.

From 21 July 1914 – 14 November 1915, the Flotilla based at Honolulu, Hawaii's Naval Submarine Base Pearl Harbor for development operations in the Hawaiian Islands.

F-1 was in ordinary from 15 March 1916 – 13 June 1917. When she returned to full commission, she served with the Patrol Force, Pacific, making surface and submerged runs to continue her part in the development of submarine tactics. Her base during this time was San Pedro, California. On 17 December 1917, while maneuvering in exercises off Point Loma, San Diego, California, F-1 and  collided, the former sinking in ten seconds, her port side torn forward of the engine room. Nineteen of her men were lost; the remaining three were rescued by the submarines with which she was operating.

Notes

References

External links

On Eternal Patrol: USS F-1

United States F-class submarines
World War I submarines of the United States
Lost submarines of the United States
United States submarine accidents
Submarines sunk in collisions
Shipwrecks of the California coast
Maritime incidents in 1917
Ships built in San Francisco
1911 ships
Ships built by Union Iron Works